Trap Door Theatre is an American, Jeff Award-winning, avant-garde theatre company based in Chicago. Its focus is on European and original experimental material.

History

Trap Door Theatre, founded by Beata Pilch and Sean Marlow, was incorporated in 1990 as a nomadic company touring theatre in Stockholm, Berlin, Zakopane, and Paris. In 1994, Trap Door brought its European tradition to the United States, creating a permanent home for the company in Chicago. 
 
Trap Door Theatre is located in Bucktown in Chicago in a  converted performance space which seats 45.

Ensemble

Maryam Abdi
Venice Averyheart
Dennis Bisto
Abby Blankenship
Marzena Bukowska
Holly T. Cerney
Gary Damico
Bill Gordon
David A. Holcombe 
John Kahara
Lyndsay Rose Kane
Anna Klos
Emily Lotspeich
Miguel Long
David Lovejoy (Associate Managing Director)
Leslie Lund
Michael Mejia (Company Manager)
Emily Nichelson
Beata Pilch (Artistic Director, Co-Founder)
Chris Popio 
Manuela Rentea
Ann Sonneville
Keith Surney
Nicole Wiesner (Managing Director)
Bob Wilson
Carl Wisniewski
Max Truax (Resident Director)
Kate Hendrickson (Resident Director)
Richard Norwood (Resident Light Designer)
Danny Rockett (Resident Sound Designer)
Zsófia Ötvös (Resident Makeup Artist)
Rachel Sypniewski (Resident Costume Designer)
Milan Pribisic (Resident Dramaturg)
Michal Janicki (Resident Graphic Designer)

Honorary Members include Tiffany Bedwell, Danny Belrose, Antonio Brunetti, Summer Chance, Dani Deac, Ewelina Dobiesz, Kristie Hassinger, Sean Marlow (Co-Founder), Kim McKean, Catherine Sullivan, Andrew Cooper Wasser, Michael Garvey, Bob Rokos, Tiffany Joy Ross, Wesley Walker, Michael S. Pieper, and Krishna Le Fan.

Notable productions

How to Explain The History of Communism to Mental Patients (March 2016, Romania: May 2016) 
La Bête (March 2015) 
First Ladies (March 2011)
Beholder (May 2008) 
Nana (December 2002)
Lebensraum (March 2000) 
Porcelain (March 2001) 
Beholder (May 2008)
Emma (October 2007)
The Bitter Tears of Petra Von Kant (September 2006)
Old Clown Wanted (New York: November 2005; Chicago: November 2005; Romania: May 2007)
My Liver is Senseless
AmeriKafka
The Crazy Locomotive (New York: August 2005; Chicago: June 2005; Romania: May 2007)
Horses at the Window (March 2009 Romania: May 2009 Virginia, New York: November 2009)
Me Too, I am Catherine Deneuve (October 2010 Georgia, December 2010 Washington DC, April 2011 France, April 2012)

Awards and honors

Joseph Jefferson Award citations

Best Original Music (Danny Rockett, How to Explain the History of Communism to Mental Patients)
Best Actor in a Principal Role (Kevin Cox, La Bête)
Best Costume Design (Rachel Sypniewski, La Bête)
Best Original Incidental Music (Ovidiu Iloc, The Word Progress on my Mother’s Lips Doesn’t Ring True)
Best Actress in a Principal Role (Nicole Wiesner, First Ladies)
Best New Work (Ken Prestininzi, Beholder)
Best Ensemble (Nana)
Best Supporting Actress (Sharon Gopfert, Lebensraum)
Best Supporting Actor (Eric Johnson, Lebensraum)
Best Ensemble (Lebensraum)
Best Ensemble (Porcelain)

References

External links
 Official website

Theatre companies in Chicago